The Pankritio Stadium (Pagkritio Stadio, literally: Pancretan Stadium) is a multi-purpose sports stadium located in Heraklion on the island of Crete. It was completed on 31 December 2003, and officially opened on 11 August 2004. As one of the most modern sports venues in Greece at the time, it was used as one of the football venues to host matches of the 2004 Summer Olympic football tournament. It has a capacity of 26,240 seats, and is currently the home ground of local association football club Ergotelis, and on occasion, the Greece national football team.

Location
The Pankritio Stadium is located in Heraklion, at the Lido district to the west of the city center. It has been built about 50 meters from the island coast, and is neighbored by the Lido Indoor Hall and the city's outdoor pool venue, of which the whole district is named after (Lido).

History
The stadium broke ground sometime during the late 80s, however construction work was not completed on time, and was eventually indefinitely postponed. Once Greece won the bid to host the 2004 Summer Olympics, construction of the stadium was finally picked up once again in 2001. It was eventually completed on 31 December 2003. The total construction cost was estimated at €50,000,000. The new stadium was officially opened on 11 August 2004, to host an international friendly game between Greece and Switzerland.

Due to its size, age and ranking, the Pankritio was selected as one of the football venues of the 2004 Summer Olympics Football Tournament, hosting in total 10 matches (5 men's Group Stage matches, 2 women's Group Stage matches, one men's Quarterfinals match, one women's Quarterfinals match and one women's Semi-Final match). After the tournament, the stadium was rented out, and has since been used as a training and home ground of the city's football club Ergotelis, and occasionally also by the Greece national football team. In 2006, the Pankritio hosted the 2005–06 Greek Cup Final, the first to be played in Heraklion since 1931.

Although primarily considered a football stadium, the Pankritio, has also been used to host major athletics events, such as the 2004 Tsiklitiria annual IAAF World Challenge meeting and the 2015 European Team Championships First League. The stadium has also been used for a number of music concerts, most notably hosting Deep Purple and Vasilis Papakonstantinou on May 6, 2011.

Facilities 
The Pankritio Stadium sports complex features in total two football grounds built to international standards (main stadium and training ground), an 8-lane track, an auxiliary 6-lane track, an indoor gym and swimming pool, multi-purpose halls for boxing, wrestling, fencing, dance, weightlifting, shooting, and tae kwon do, a rowing simulator and a physiotherapy room with sauna and hot tub. Additionally, the stadium features seminar meeting rooms, a dining room, and a showroom featuring exhibits from the 2004 Summer Olympics and 2011 Special Olympics.

The complex is neighbored by the city's outdoor swimming pool and the Lido Indoor Hall.

Tenants 
The stadium has been used as the home ground of Football League football team Ergotelis, since its opening in 2004, as their traditional home turf Nikos Kazantzakis Stadium was declared unfit for use in official matches at any level of the Greek football league system since 2004. Between 2006 and 2009, the stadium was also used by Ergotelis' rival OFI, until their original home ground, Theodoros Vardinogiannis Stadium, upgrade was done.

On occasion, the Pankritio has also hosted home games of the Greece national football team, notably attracting large numbers of spectators from all over the island.

Records 
The stadium attendance record and first ever sold-out event was set on 20 February 2005, in a Superleague match between Ergotelis and reigning champions Olympiacos with 27,950 tickets being sold. The result was a 2−1 victory for the home team.

2004 Summer Olympics

Pankritio Stadium hosted six games of the men's football tournament at the 2004 Summer Olympics, and four games of the women's Olympic Football tournament.

Men's tournament

Women's tournament

References

External links
Olympicproperties.gr profile
Information and photos of Pankritio Stadium

Sports venues completed in 2003
Sports venues in Crete
Football venues in Greece
Venues of the 2004 Summer Olympics
Olympic football venues
Buildings and structures in Heraklion
Multi-purpose stadiums in Greece
Athletics (track and field) venues in Greece